Dalla lethaea is a species of butterfly in the family Hesperiidae. It is found in Mexico (Oaxaca) and Costa Rica.

References

Butterflies described in 1913
lethaea